Döğüşbelen is a village in Muğla Province, Turkey

Geography
Döğüşbelen is a village in Köyceğiz district of Muğla Province. At  it is at the west of Köyceğiz Lake and considered as the boundary between the geographic regions Mediterranean and Aegean of Turkey. The population of the village is 1458. as of 2011.

History
The village was founded in the first half of the 19th century. The early settlers were Abkhazians who fled from the advance of Russian Empire.  In 1863, the nomadic Turkmens so called Yörük also tried to settle around the village. But the Ottoman government forces subdued them. The name of the village Döğüşbelen (fight-pass) refers to this struggle. However, after  the 1930s, i.e., during the Turkish Republic era Yörüks peacefully settled in Döğüşbelen.

Living
The average age of the population in Döğüşbelen is higher than the other villages around, for a considerable portion of the population is composed of retired people. Although the village is an agricultural village, lately tourism has also begun to play a role in village economy.

References

Villages in Muğla Province
Köyceğiz District